Essential As Anything or Essential As Anything – 30th Anniversary Edition is the fourth compilation album by Australian rock band Mental As Anything, which was released in May 2009 via Warner Music Australia. It celebrates the band's 30th anniversary. Essential As Anything includes tracks from their eight studio albums. It also included a DVD featuring Monumental and Monumental II; two compilations of the band's music videos plus bonus footage and interviews. The album reached number 54 on the ARIA Albums Chart. It was later re-released by Universal Music Australia through Syray Music.

Track listing

Personnel 

 Martin Plaza – lead vocals, guitar
 Wayne de Lisle – drums
 Reg Mombassa – guitar, vocals
 Greedy Smith – lead vocals, keyboards, harmonica
 Peter O'Doherty – bass guitar, vocals

Charts

References

2009 compilation albums
Mental As Anything albums
Compilation albums by Australian artists
2009 video albums
Albums produced by Elvis Costello
Albums produced by Mike Opitz
Albums produced by Ricky Fataar
Music video compilation albums
Rhino Records compilation albums